Thomas Aaron Goosby (born May 24, 1939) was a former American football offensive lineman in the National Football League.

Football career

Goosby played for the Cleveland Browns and the Washington Redskins. He started Left Guard for the Redskins in 1966.  He also played college football at Baldwin–Wallace College and was drafted in the fifteenth round of the 1962 NFL Draft as a redshirt. Goosby played on the Cleveland Browns in 1963 and the Washington Redskins in 1966. He missed the entire 1964 Browns season due to injury. Goosby was severely hampered by serious knee injuries which led to his early retirement from football.

References

1939 births
Living people
American football offensive guards
Baldwin Wallace Yellow Jackets football players
Cleveland Browns players
Washington Redskins players
People from Alliance, Ohio